The tourist attractions in Berat refers to the tourist attractions in Berat. The city of Berat is a city in the south of the Republic of Albania and the capital of the surrounding Berat County. It offers a variety of tourist attractions, including historical sights, monuments, museums, theatres, churches, monasteries, mosques and places.

Berat was designated a UNESCO World Heritage Site in 2008 comprising a unique style of architecture with influences from several civilizations that have managed to coexist for centuries throughout the history. Like many cities in Albania, the city includes an old fortified city filled with churches and mosques painted with grandiose wealth of visible murals and frescos.

See also 

 Culture of Albania
 Tourism in Albania
 Arts & Architecture of Albania

References 

 

 
 
Tourist attractions in Albania